Sonia Nohelia Ibarra Fránquez (born 17 September 1966) is a Mexican politician from the Party of the Democratic Revolution. From 2006 to 2009 she was a deputy in the LX Legislature of the Mexican Congress representing Nayarit.

References

1966 births
Living people
Politicians from Nayarit
Women members of the Chamber of Deputies (Mexico)
Party of the Democratic Revolution politicians
21st-century Mexican politicians
21st-century Mexican women politicians
Deputies of the LX Legislature of Mexico
Members of the Chamber of Deputies (Mexico) for Nayarit